Rui Borges may refer to:
Rui Borges (swimmer) (born 1967), Portuguese swimmer
Rui Borges (footballer) (born 1973), Portuguese former footballer who played as a midfielder